In the mathematical field of graph theory, the ladder graph  is a planar, undirected graph with  vertices and  edges.

The ladder graph can be obtained as the Cartesian product of two path graphs, one of which has only one edge: .

Properties
By construction, the ladder graph Ln is isomorphic to the grid graph G2,n and looks like a ladder with n rungs. It is Hamiltonian with girth 4 (if n>1) and chromatic index 3 (if n>2).

Ladder rung graph
Sometimes the term "ladder graph" is used for the n × P2 ladder rung graph, which is the graph union of n copies of the path graph P2.

Circular ladder graph 

The circular ladder graph CLn is constructible by connecting the four 2-degree vertices in a straight way, or by the Cartesian product of a cycle of length n ≥ 3 and an edge.
In symbols, . It has 2n nodes and 3n edges.
Like the ladder graph, it is connected, planar and Hamiltonian, but it is bipartite if and only if n is even.

Circular ladder graph are the polyhedral graphs of prisms, so they are more commonly called prism graphs.

Circular ladder graphs:

Möbius ladder 

Connecting the four 2-degree vertices crosswise creates a cubic graph called a Möbius ladder.

References 

Parametric families of graphs
Planar graphs